Nathaniel Herne may refer to:
 Sir Nathaniel Herne (1629–1679), member of Parliament for Dartmouth in 1679
 Nathaniel Herne (1668–1722), his son, MP for Dartmouth 1701–13